The list of Olympic men's ice hockey players for Bulgaria consists of 16 skaters and 2 goaltenders. Men's ice hockey tournaments have been staged at the Olympic Games since 1920 (it was introduced at the 1920 Summer Olympics, and was permanently added to the Winter Olympic Games in 1924). Bulgaria has participated in one tournament, the 1976 Winter Olympics, where they finished last of the twelve nations competing. 

Milcho Nenov scored the most goals (4) and tied with three other players for the most assists (2). Nenov also had the most points (6).

Key

Goaltenders

Skaters

See also
 Bulgaria men's national ice hockey team

Notes

References
 
 
 
 

Bulgaria men's national ice hockey team
ice hockey
Bulgaria
Bulgaria